Pseudotolida awana is a beetle in the genus Pseudotolida of the family Mordellidae. It was described in 1932 by Kôno.

References

Mordellidae
Beetles described in 1932